Thomas "Tom" Corsi is a fictional character appearing in American comic books published by Marvel Comics, most often appearing in X-Men stories. Tom first appeared in The New Mutants #19 (1984) and was created by Chris Claremont and Bill Sienkiewicz.

Fictional character biography

The Attack of the Demon Bear
Tom Corsi was a member of the police department in Westchester County. The Demon Bear carried out an attack on Dani Moonstar. After her attack, the New Mutants brought Dani to the Mid-County Medical Center. At the hospital, Tom and Sharon Friedlander, an ER nurse, were kidnapped and possessed by the Demon Bear. The Demon Bear attempted to transform Corsi and Friedlander into his demonic slaves. After the New Mutants defeated the bear, Tom and Sharon were returned to their natural human form, though a couple of physical changes. The two of them—who are both Caucasian—now physically resemble Native Americans, along with being enhanced to the level of perfect human specimens.

Battle with the X-Mens' ennemies
Later, Tom and Sharon are mentally attacked by the New Mutants long-term adversary, Empath. The man twists the attraction the two have for each other into a sexual obsession, which lasts for several days.

Afterwards, Tom spent some time at the Xavier's School for Gifted Youngsters. Eventually, Tom found himself involved in a battle with the Reavers on Muir Island. Tom was also one of the Muir Islanders being manipulated by the Shadow King, at the time.

Time at Our Mother of the Sacred Heart
Being part of Charles Xavier's Mutant Underground, he was asked to work at 'Our Mother of the Sacred Heart', a school for the disabled. The school eventually came under attack by a group of Acolytes looking for a potential mutant. In the process, Tom kills one of the Kleinstock Brothers. Sharon is slain by Joanna Cargill. The X-Men, summoned by Sharon before her death, defeat the Acolytes.

Teaching gym IS tough
Some time after, Tom was a gym teacher at the Massachusetts Academy, a school for mutants run by the White Queen. He teaches physical education to the mutants that reside there, a small group known as Generation X. When that facility is closed down, he moves back to the Xavier Institute. After many more students join Xaviers, Corsi again becomes a physical education teacher. The student called Elixir is in his class.

After M-Day, Corsi is let go due to the loss of 90% of the student body. Danielle Moonstar was also let go. His current whereabouts are unknown.

Powers and abilities
Due to the Demon Bear's enchantment of his body, Tom has moderately enhanced strength. He claims he can lift twice the amount of the world weight lifting record with relative ease.

References

Comics characters introduced in 1984
Characters created by Bill Sienkiewicz
Characters created by Chris Claremont
Fictional American police officers
Fictional schoolteachers
Marvel Comics characters with superhuman strength
Marvel Comics mutates
Marvel Comics superheroes